Six-day cycling is a track cycling event that competes over six days. Six-day races started in Britain, spread to many regions of the world, were brought to their modern style in the United States and are now mainly a European event. Initially, individuals competed alone, the winner being the individual who completed the most laps. However, the format was changed to allow teams (usually of two riders each), one rider racing while the other rested. The 24-hours a day regime has also been relaxed, so that most six-day races involve six nights of racing, typically from 6pm to 2am, on indoor tracks (velodromes). Six-day events are annually hosted in London, Berlin, Ghent, Copenhagen, Hong Kong, Manchester, Melbourne and Brisbane.

The overall winner is the team which completes most laps. In the event of teams completing the same number of laps, the winner is the team with most points won in intermediate competitions (see points race). As well as the 'chase' to gain laps over competitors, a typical six-day programme will include time trials, motor-paced, intermediate sprint and elimination races. In the main 'chase' or madison events (so-called after Madison Square Garden in New York City, where the two-man format was devised), both riders may be on the track at the same time, taking it in turns to race, hand-slinging each other back into action.

Origins
The first six-day event was an individual time trial at the Agricultural Hall in Islington, London, in 1878, when a professional called David Stanton sought a bet that he could ride 1,000 miles in six successive days, riding 18 hours a day. A Mr Davis put up £100 and the stake was held by the Sporting Life newspaper. Stanton started at 6am on 25 February and won the bet in 73 hours, riding on a high-wheeled machine at an average speed of 13.5 mph.

Six-day cycle races involving more than one rider grew out of the 19th-century enthusiasm for endurance and other novelty competitions. A promoter at the Agricultural Hall held a six-day walking contest in April 1877. It was enough of a success for another to be held the following year. That inspired another organiser, name no longer known, to organise a six-day race in the same hall but for cyclists, also in 1878. He hoped to attract the crowd of 20,000 a day that had turned out for the walkers.

The Islington Gazette reported:
"A bicycle contest was commenced at the Agricultural Hall, on Monday last, for which £150 is offered in prizes for a six days' competition, the money to be allocated thus: £100 for the first man, £25 for the second, £15 for the third, and £10 for the fourth."

The race started at 6am with only four of the 12 entrants on the track. Although it is often said that the first six-day was a non-stop, no-sleeping event that ran without pause for six days, in fact riders joined in when they chose and slept as they wished.

The winner was Bill Cann, of Sheffield, who led from the start and finished after 1,060 miles.

The first American six-days

However, the event did not become popular until 1891, when the first Six Days of New York were held in New York's Madison Square Garden. Initially, these races were contests of raw endurance, with a single rider completing as many laps as possible.  At first, races were less than 24 hours a day. Riders slept at night and were free to join in the morning when they chose. Faster riders would start later than the slower ones, who would sacrifice sleep to make up for lack of pace. Quickly, riders began competing 24 hours a day, limited only by their ability to stay awake. Many employed seconds, as in boxing, to keep them going. The seconds, known by their French name, soigneurs, were said to have used doping to keep their riders circling the track. Riders became desperately tired. According to a contemporary newspaper clipping retained by Major Taylor:

The riders are becoming peevish and fretful.  The wear and tear upon their nerves and their muscles, and the loss of sleep make them so. If their desires are not met with on the moment, they break forth with a stream of abuse. Nothing pleases them. These outbreaks do not trouble the trainers with experience, for they understand the condition the men are in.

The condition included delusions and hallucinations. Riders wobbled and fell. But they were often well paid, especially since more people came to watch as their condition worsened. Promoters in New York paid Teddy Hale US$5,000 when he won in 1896 and he won "like a ghost, his face as white as a corpse, his eyes no longer visible because they'd retreated into his skull", according to one report. The New York Times said in 1897:

It is a fine thing that a man astride two wheels can, in a six-day race, distance a hound, horse, or a locomotive. It confirms the assumption, no longer much contested, that the human animal is superior to the other animals. But this undisputed thing is being said in too solemn and painful way at Madison Square Garden. An athletic contest in which participants 'go queer' in their heads, and strain their powers until their faces become hideous with the tortures that rack them, is not sport. It is brutality. Days and weeks of recuperation will be needed to put the Garden racers in condition, and it is likely that some of them will never recover from the strain.

Introduction of the two-man team events
Six-day racing remained popular in the US, even though the states of New York and Illinois led in 1898 in limiting races to 12 of 24 hours. The intention was to allow riders to rest half the day, but promoters realised that teams of two, with only one rider on the track at a time, would give each the 12 hours' rest the law intended while still allowing the race to go around the clock. Races lasted six days rather than a week to avoid racing on Sunday. Speeds rose, distances grew, crowds increased, money poured in. Where Charlie Miller rode 2,088 miles alone, Alf Goullet and a decent partner could ride 2,790. The first such race was at Madison Square Garden and two-man tag racing has become known in English as a madison and to the French as l'américaine.

In the main 'chase' or madison sessions, both riders may be on the track at the same time, taking it in turns to race, hand-slinging each other back into action. The non-racing rider will circle the track slowly at the top of the banking until 'slung' back into the race. The hand-sling is an advanced skill that, in some countries, is only allowed for professional riders. The racing rider may also propel a teammate into the race by pushing the seat of the rider's racing shorts.

The historian Raymond Dickow said of riders in the post-1898 races:
The highest paid was Alfred Goullet of Australia. He earned $1,000 a day in addition to cash prizes won during sprints. Top riders like Bobby Walthour, US; Franco Giorgetti, Italy; Gérard Debaets, Belgium; and Alfred Letourneur, France, were making from $500 to $750 a day. Amateurs who had just turned pro, and still had to prove their worth, were paid the beginners' rate of $100 a day.

Sixes attracted enthusiasts and celebrities. Knute Rockne, George Raft, Barbara Stanwyck, and Otto Kruger were fans. Kruger used to invite riders home. Bing Crosby – whose presence at a track guaranteed he would be met by song-publishers' touts offering him music – was said to pay the hospital bills of riders who fell. The actress Peggy Joyce – whose wealth was such that Cole Porter wrote a lyric that said My string of Rolls-Royces, is longer than Peggy Joyce's – gave regular $200 bonus prizes, or primes. She was so delighted when a band in the track centre played Pretty Peggy with eyes of Blue that she put up $1,000.

Racing was at its hardest when the stands were full. Riders took it easy when they were empty and circled the track reading newspapers, talking, even writing letters as they pedalled with one foot, the other steering the handlebars. But sometimes a team would attack when things were quiet. Jimmy Walthour remembered one such night in 1933:

Six-day racing was popular in the United States until the Second World War.  Then the rise of the automobile and the Great Depression brought a decline. Dickow said: "Attempts were made to revive the sport by several different promoters but none of them managed to restore bike racing to its former popularity." A further problem was that the more promoters brought in European opposition to spice up races for a potential crowd, the more the Europeans dominated and lessened the appeal for spectators. Jerry Rodman, one of the American riders, said: "In previous years, six-day bicycle racing faded only as a result of war or depression. Under the promotion of Harry Mendel, however, the sport, for the first time began to decline due to lack of spectator interest."

Annual sixes in Boston were discontinued in 1933, Detroit in 1936, and Chicago in 1948. The Six Days of New York hung on until 1950. There were some revivals but none succeeded. Sporting Cyclist published a picture of the last night of the Chicago six in 1957 being ridden with seven people in the quarter of the stands that the camera caught.

European popularity

The success of madisons in America led to their introduction in Europe. The first was at Toulouse in 1906, although it was abandoned after three days because of lack of interest. Berlin tried, three years later, with success. Five races were held in Germany in 1911–12. Brussels followed in 1912 and Paris in 1913.

The six-day race continued to do well in Europe. Its heart was in Germany – although races were curtailed in Germany by the Nazis, a six-day event was held in 1938 and was attended by a number of international representatives. These events were strong too, in Belgium and France. In 1923 the journalist Egon Erwin Kisch attended the tenth staging of the Berlin Six Day Race and wrote a celebrated piece "Elliptische Tretmuehle" (Elliptical Treadmill). London saw one race at Olympia in July 1923, and then a series of races at Wembley starting in 1936. The local man, Frank Southall, crashed and left for hospital. So did another British hope, Syd Cozens. Only nine of the 15 teams lasted the race. The series continued, with more success, until the start of the second world war in 1939.

Racing began hesitantly after 1945. The first in Germany for 17 years were in 1950; two further races were held at Wembley in 1951 and 1952. Eventually, though, European races began to decline. Races continued through the night, as they had in the US, but the costs of keeping open stadiums for partygoers who'd missed the bus and a small number of dedicated fans was too great. London dropped night racing when it revived six-day racing in 1967 at Earls Court and the following year at Wembley a new organiser, former rider Ron Webb, scheduled just the afternoon and evening, with a break between sessions. Other organisers were not impressed and insisted Webb call his race a "six" and not a "six-day". One by one, however, they followed Webb's pattern and there are now no old-style 24-hour races left. The last was Madrid. There the riders trundled round all night or, if they could get away with it, slipped off for bed. Tom Simpson remembered:

Our mechanic and general runner was David Nice, an Englishman from Colchester, who was not unlike me in a way, for his nose appeared to be, profile view anyway, very similar to mine (poor lad!) and I hit on the splendid idea of putting him out on the track in my place during the neutralised period. Tracksuited, a scarf over the lower part of his face and a Russian hat that I had bought completed the disguise. He was me to anyone giving a cursory glance at the figures plodding round the track. The get-up was quite in order for it became very cold there at night as they used to turn off all the heating. Everything went well for the first night of the wheeze and I congratulated myself on the plan. It could not go on for ever, though, worse luck, for on the very next night the game was up. Dave was trundling round wrapped up to the eyebrows as before when, horrors upon horrors, the track manager, who often rode a bike round himself during the quiet time, started to talk to him.

He thought it was me at first and chatted away quite happily to Dave, whose French was near enough non-existent. Well, it was not long before he sensed something was wrong and whipped the scarf off the poor lad's face. He stormed over to my cabin and dragged me out, half asleep, on to the track. That was that! He and the other officials kept their eyes on us after that and we had little chance of getting away with any more larks like that.

The London Six at Wembley continued annually until 1980.

Reinventing six day cycling
Founded in 2013, Madison Sports Group, a promoter of cycling events, decided in 2015 to reinvigorate the competition through the introduction of new Six day cycling events in six major cities across the globe, which together form the Six Day Series. The series starts in London travelling across the world, where it touches down in Berlin, Copenhagen, Melbourne and Manchester, before concluding in Brisbane. Although the Six Day Series is their flagship concept, MSG have previously promoted the Rotterdam, Amsterdam and Mallorca Six Day events and are unveiling as Hong Kong the first host in Asia in March 2019.

In 2015, not long after the London 2012 Olympic Games, Madison Sports Group brought Six day Cycling back to London, the event being held at the Lee Valley Velodrome, which had been built as part of the Olympic legacy. Sir Bradley Wiggins chose the 2016 London event as his last UK track appearance and riders like the Australian Olympic gold medallists Cameron Meyer and Callum Scotson have also featured.

The women's event has also grown with the opportunity to compete in the Madison, an added attraction for some of the world's best exponents of track racing. Two-time world champion Kirsten Wild has attended in previous years, whilst Six Day Manchester 2019 will see Britain's joint most-decorated female Olympic track cyclist, Laura Kenny, compete. Kenny will also be joined by Six Day London 2017 and Olympic team Pursuit champion Katie Archibald, and fellow British Cycling teammate Elinor Barker, an Olympic, two-time world and four-time European champion.

Most six-day victories
Names in bold are riders still racing.

Six-days

Six-day races
 2006–07 Six Days Track Cycling Events
 2007–08 Six Days Track Cycling Events

References

External links

 Velodrome.org.uk - A Home for Track Cyclists on the Web - Six-Day Page
 A somewhat slanted article discussing the history of Six Day racing in the US
 6dayracing.ca, a Canadian & USA History of Sixday Racing including reports and results, old 6-day programs and memorabilia.

 
Events in track cycling